Elections to Lisburn Borough Council were held on 19 May 1993 on the same day as the other Northern Irish local government elections. The election used five district electoral areas to elect a total of 30 councillors.

Election results

Note: "Votes" are the first preference votes.

Districts summary

|- class="unsortable" align="centre"
!rowspan=2 align="left"|Ward
! % 
!Cllrs
! % 
!Cllrs
! %
!Cllrs
! %
!Cllrs
! % 
!Cllrs
! %
!Cllrs
! % 
!Cllrs
! %
!Cllrs
!rowspan=2|TotalCllrs
|- class="unsortable" align="center"
!colspan=2 bgcolor="" | UUP
!colspan=2 bgcolor="" | DUP
!colspan=2 bgcolor="" | Sinn Féin
!colspan=2 bgcolor="" | SDLP
!colspan=2 bgcolor="" | Alliance
!colspan=2 bgcolor="" | UDP
!colspan=2 bgcolor="" | Conservative
!colspan=2 bgcolor="white"| Others
|-
|align="left"|Downshire
|bgcolor="40BFF5"|41.6
|bgcolor="40BFF5"|3
|24.7
|1
|0.0
|0
|0.0
|0
|13.2
|0
|4.7
|1
|15.7
|1
|0.0
|0
|5
|-
|align="left"|Dunmurry Cross
|22.5
|2
|5.5
|0
|bgcolor="#008800"|37.3
|bgcolor="#008800"|3
|21.0
|2
|5.1
|0
|0.0
|0
|0.0
|0
|8.6
|0
|7
|-
|align="left"|Killultagh
|bgcolor="40BFF5"|48.4
|bgcolor="40BFF5"|3
|26.3
|1
|0.0
|0
|16.0
|1
|9.3
|0
|0.0
|0
|0.0
|0
|0.0
|0
|5
|-
|align="left"|Lisburn Town North
|bgcolor="40BFF5"|34.3
|bgcolor="40BFF5"|3
|18.9
|1
|0.0
|0
|0.0
|0
|17.9
|1
|5.9
|0
|2.9
|0
|20.1
|1
|7
|-
|align="left"|Lisburn Town South
|bgcolor="40BFF5"|56.0
|bgcolor="40BFF5"|4
|8.3
|0
|0.0
|0
|0.0
|0
|17.1
|1
|14.1
|1
|3.7
|0
|0.8
|0
|6
|- class="unsortable" class="sortbottom" style="background:#C9C9C9"
|align="left"| Total
|39.1
|16
|15.8
|3
|9.3
|3
|7.9
|3
|12.3
|2
|4.8
|1
|4.1
|1
|6.7
|3
|30
|-
|}

Districts results

Downshire

1993: 3 x UUP, 1 x DUP, 1 x Conservative

Dunmurry Cross

1993: 3 x Sinn Féin, 2 x UUP, 2 x SDLP

Killultagh

1993: 3 x UUP, 1 x DUP, 1 x SDLP

Lisburn Town North

1993: 4 x UUP, 1 x Alliance, 1 x DUP, 1 x Independent Unionist

Lisburn Town South

1993: 4 x UUP, 1 x Alliance, 1 x UDP

References

Lisburn City Council elections
Lisburn